"Turn the Beat Around" is a disco song written by Gerald Jackson and Peter Jackson, and performed by American actress and singer Vicki Sue Robinson in 1976 (see 1976 in music), originally appearing on her debut album, Never Gonna Let You Go (1976). Released as a single, the song went to #10 on the Billboard pop charts, and #73 on the Billboard soul chart. The song earned Robinson a Grammy nomination for Best Female Pop Vocal Performance. The track also went to number one on the Billboard disco chart for four weeks. "Turn the Beat Around" is considered a disco classic and is featured on many compilation albums.

Background
"Turn the Beat Around" was written by brothers Gerald and Peter Jackson of the R&B outfit Touch of Class. Peter Jackson knew Al Garrison, an engineer at Associated Studios in New York, through Jackson's work as a session drummer, and it was at Associated Studios that Touch of Class cut its own demos. Peter Jackson recalls that one Sunday at noontime "I called Al and said...we want to come in and [cut a] demo...He was leaving at four...He said: 'My girl[friend]’s coming to pick me up for dinner. You have to be done [by then]."

Garrison's girlfriend turned out to be singer Vicki Sue Robinson whose debut album was nearing completion requiring one additional track. On arriving at Associated Studios that Sunday, Robinson overheard the playback of the "Turn the Beat Around" demo which Touch of Class had just recorded and according to Peter Jackson said: "Oh, man, I’ve gotta have that song." Gerald and Peter Jackson initially demurred, wishing to submit "Turn the Beat Around" along with four earlier demos to be green-lighted for the Touch of Class debut album.

Peter Jackson - "Monday [the next day], Gerald and I go up to Midland [Touch of Class' label]. We’re excited because we know this song ["Turn the Beat Around"] is slammin’...[Midland] took the other four songs and they passed on that one. They said: 'We don't like that one. The lyrics move too fast. You have that jungle beat in there. It's not what's happening'." Peter Jackson resultantly called Vicki Sue Robinson to give her the song for her album. When Jackson told Robinson: "'I'll meet you down on Thirty-Fourth Street [with the demo]' she said: 'I [already] made Al give me a copy.'"

Robinson recorded "Turn the Beat Around" on September 26, 1975, cutting her lead vocal in a single take after recording her own multi-tracked chorale vocals. Like the other cuts on Robinson's debut album Never Gonna Let You Go, "Turn the Beat Around" was recorded at RCA Studios with producer Warren Schatz who recalls the basic master of the song was recorded "on a Friday after a very depressing week of rain [and] I hated [the track]! I listened to it in my office and I just couldn't get it. It had been such a bad week that I just couldn't hear anything with an open mind. Then David Todd, the head of disco promotion at RCA, came into my office and he went crazy over the track! He convinced me to finish it as soon as possible."

Issued as a single in February 1976 "Turn the Beat Around" became a club smash subsequently breaking on Top 40 radio in Boston - where it would reach #1 that June - to make a gradual ascent on the national Pop chart: the Billboard Hot 100 to reach a #10 peak in August 1976.

Charts

Weekly charts

Year-end charts

Laura Branigan version

American singer-songwriter and actress Laura Branigan covered the song in 1990, becoming the first major artist to do so. It was released as the third and final single from her self-titled sixth studio album (1990), however only to radio and clubs. The song was co-produced by Branigan and Steve Lindsey for the album, with several remix versions following garnering significant play in Hi-NRG clubs.

Critical reception
Bill Coleman from Billboard wrote, "Trend-conscious rendition of Vicki Sue Robinson's disco classic lacks the spark needed to ignite widespread action, though Branigan's sonic vocal attack is always a treat."

Track listings

Gloria Estefan version

 
In 1994 (see 1994 in music), the song was recorded by Cuban-American singer and songwriter Gloria Estefan for the soundtrack to the film The Specialist, starring Sylvester Stallone and Sharon Stone. It is also featured on Estefan's fourth solo album, Hold Me, Thrill Me, Kiss Me (1994). Released as a single, it became a hit reaching number 13 on the Billboard Hot 100. Estefan also took the song to the top spot on Billboard's Hot Dance Club Play chart, making it her first number-one song on that chart in English. In Australia and New Zealand the song charted at number 8 and 18. In Europe, the song peaked at number 21 in the United Kingdom, number 24 in Scotland, number 27 in the Netherlands and number 29 in Belgium. Estefan performed the song as her opening performance in VH1's first ever Divas Live. In 2018, Australian music channel Max included Estefan's "Turn the Beat Around" in their list of "1000 Greatest Songs of All Time".

Critical reception
Larry Flick from Billboard felt that Estefan "has not delivered a pop single with this much verve and energy in a long while. The groove is reminiscent of her own classic "Conga", and it is wrapped in delicious layers of live strings and horns. An inspired pairing of song and artist that will likely spark heavy top 40 and club activity." Josef Woodard from Entertainment Weekly said that Estefan's "easygoing charms still do the trick" on the song. Joey Guerra from Houston Chronicle called it a "pulsing rendition". Jeremy Griffin from The Ithacan declared it as a "rousing cover". Chuck Campbell from Knoxville News Sentinel complimented Estefan as "a natural" to remake the disco classic. 

Pan-European magazine Music & Media noted that here, the singer "revives her Miami Sound Machine days of fatback disco". Alan Jones from Music Week gave the song three out of five, describing it as "an intoxicating mix of Latin rhythms and disco sensibilities. Likely to earn her a substantial hit." John Kilgo from The Network Forty declared it as a "classic" remake of the 1976 "Top 10 gem", adding that it has "uptempo flavor spiced with trademark Miami Sound Machine overtones". A reviewer from People Magazine called it "an exuberant run" through Robinson's disco classic, that "demand repeated listens." Brad Beatnik from the RM Dance Update viewed it as "fairly standard disco fare" from Estefan.

Retrospective response
AllMusic editor Eddie Huffman complimented the song as a "brilliant pop hit". In 2014, Maryann Scheufele from AXS, featured it in her list of "10 Best Gloria Estefan's Songs", saying that "this song is a sound that moved girls to dance like Gloria Estefan. She was a leader in the freedom of movement otherwise known as Latino style." Pip Ellwood-Hughes from Entertainment Focus also ranked it among Estefan's 10 best songs, descring it as a "raucous dance number". In an 2015 retrospective review of Hold Me, Thrill Me, Kiss Me, Phil Shanklin of ReviewsRevues felt that this is "an excellent choice for Gloria whose voice is similar to Vicki Sue’s". He also remarked that it has "the same Latin vibe as the best of Miami Sound Machine".

Music video
A music video was produced to promote the single, directed by German feature film director and producer Marcus Nispel. It features Gloria performing with her band atop of a large building, while a helicopter are flying in the air above them. In between, there are clips from the movie The Specialist. The video was later published on Gloria's official YouTube channel in October 2013, and had generated almost 10 million views as of January 2023.

Charts and certifications

Weekly charts

Year-end charts

Certifications

Other versions and appearances in media
The chorus is used in the lead out of the 1982 Soft Cell song "Memorabilia".
Lil Suzy covered the song for her 1993 album Back to Dance. It was released as the lead single.
Cobra Starship covered the song for the MTV movie of the same name.
A television advertisement for "I Can't Believe It's Not Butter" featuring Megan Mullally contains the parody "Turn the Tub Around"
 In the second Star Wars Family Guy episode, the song is parodied as "Turn the Ship Around".
 In 2003, the Gloria Estefan's version is used in Mitsubishi Kuda Grandia advertisement in Indonesia along with the three Bon Jovi songs: It's My Life, Always and Everyday.
The 2005 song "Perfection" by Dannii Minogue and the Soul Seekerz samples "Turn the Beat Around".
 This song was covered many times on American Idol. Both Carmen Rasmusen and Diana DeGarmo performed this song at the Top 6 of American Idol Season 2 and Season 3, respectively. Haley Scarnato also covered this on the sixth season of American Idol. Jessica Sanchez performed the song on the Top 12 of American Idol Season 11.
 This song is featured on the 2012 movie Pitch Perfect, as part of the performance by the group Barden Bellas.
 The song appeared in the 2015 movie The Martian directed by Ridley Scott and starring Matt Damon.
 The song is featured in the 2016 Netflix series "The Get Down" created by Baz Luhrmann.
 The Vicki Sue Robinson recording of the song appears in the 2016 episode of the drama Elementary, “Turn it Upside-Down”.
 The beat from the Vikki Sue Robinson original was used in the Jam & Spoon trance classic Odyssey to Anyoona.

References

1976 singles
1994 singles
1976 songs
Atlantic Records singles
Epic Records singles
RCA Victor singles
Vicki Sue Robinson songs
Laura Branigan songs
Gloria Estefan songs
Disco songs
Music videos directed by Marcus Nispel
Songs about dancing
Songs about music